Scott King (born January 21, 1977) is a Canadian former professional ice hockey player who last played for Lausitzer Füchse in the DEL2 league.

Career statistics

Awards and honours
ECHL Most Valuable Player (2000–01)
ECHL Leading Scorer (2000–01)
Participated in 2009 Spengler Cup (with Adler Mannheim)

External links

1977 births
Living people
Adler Mannheim players
Augsburger Panther players
Boston University Terriers men's ice hockey players
Charlotte Checkers (1993–2010) players
EC Bad Tölz players
Fredericton Canadiens players
Hannover Scorpions players
Ice hockey people from Saskatchewan
Iserlohn Roosters players
Kelowna Rockets players
Krefeld Pinguine players
Lausitzer Füchse players
Milwaukee Admirals players
Mississippi Sea Wolves players
New Orleans Brass players
Nürnberg Ice Tigers players
Sportspeople from Saskatoon
Springfield Falcons players
Canadian expatriate ice hockey players in Germany
Canadian ice hockey centres